Liu Wanting (born February 16, 1989) is a Chinese former professional tennis player.

Wanting won 14 doubles titles on the ITF Women's Circuit. On 30 July 2007, she reached her best singles ranking of world No. 310. On 8 October 2012, she peaked at No. 110 in the WTA doubles rankings.

Her best result is reaching the doubles final of the 2010 Guangzhou International Open.

WTA career finals

Doubles: 1 (runner-up)

ITF Circuit finals

Singles: 1 (0–1)

Doubles: 25 (14–11)

References
 
 

Chinese female tennis players
Tennis players from Beijing
1989 births
Living people
21st-century Chinese women